Big Daddy is an album by the American blues musician Bukka White, released in 1974. It was White's final album. Big Daddy was reissued by Shout! Factory in 2004.

The album was nominated for a Grammy Award, in the "Best Ethnic or Traditional Recording" category.

Production
The album was recorded in Memphis, Tennessee, with White playing a National Triolian guitar.

Critical reception

Billboard called Big Daddy "both nostalgic and refreshing."

AllMusic thought that "White conjures up in the studio the essence of the revival sound: a man, a guitar, and an authentic delivery." The Commercial Appeal wrote: "Slide master White ... manhandled his guitar, a force of nature that was akin to watching a dam break and the flood of blues run wild. His singing, even at this, his final session, matched every defiant, plucked note." 

The Day deemed the album "genuine and powerful," and named the reissue one of the best albums of 2004. The New Rolling Stone Record Guide called it "an important source of delta styles," writing that "White did have a powerful bottleneck style."

Track listing

References

1974 albums